This is a list of the 11 members of the European Parliament for Ireland elected at the 2014 European Parliament election. They served in the 2014 to 2019 session.

List

See also
Members of the European Parliament 2014–2019 – List by country
List of members of the European Parliament, 2014–2019 – Full alphabetical list

References

External links
ElectionsIreland.org – 2014 European Parliament (Ireland) election

2014
European Parliament
 List
Ireland